Stephanie Marie Vander Werf Lobato, (born October 26, 1986, in Panama City)  is a Panamanian TV host,  model and beauty pageant contestant winner of the Miss Panama 2012 on March 30, 2012, for the Miss Universe 2012 contest.

Early life
Born in Panama City, Vander Werf is a model of Dutch ancestry, and recognized TV host. She graduated in Advertising and Public Relations from Texas Christian University in Fort Worth, Texas, United States.

Modelling career
The start of her modeling career took place at the age of fifteen years, gaining a tremendous success nationally and internationally promptly went on television screens and their own program, which remained in the air for a period of two years.

Miss Panamá 2012

At the end of the Miss Panamá 2012 she also received awards including Miss Eloquence.

Vander Werf is 5 ft 10 in (1.78 m) tall, and competed in the national beauty pageant Miss Panamá 2012. She represented the state of Panamá Centro.

Miss Universe 2012
She represented Panamá at the 61st Miss Universe pageant held on December 19, 2012, at the Theatre for the Performing Arts at the Planet Hollywood Resort & Casino in Las Vegas, Nevada, United States.

See also
 Maricely González
 Miss Panamá 2012

References

External links
Panamá 2012 official website
Miss Panamá

1986 births
Living people
Panamanian beauty pageant winners
Panamanian female models
Miss Universe 2012 contestants
Señorita Panamá
Panamanian people of Dutch descent